Shamzan-e Hiyet (also Romanized as Shamzān-e Hīyet) is a village in Qaleh Ganj Rural District, in the Central District of Qaleh Ganj County, Kerman Province, Iran. At the 2006 census, its population was 470, in 91 families.

References 

Populated places in Qaleh Ganj County